Tiger Eye P. I. is an investigative organization based in Accra, Ghana. It is headed by multiple award-winning investigative journalist Anas Aremeyaw Anas. The organization has undertaken several high-profile investigation to expose corruption, human trafficking, smuggling, human rights abuses among other. It regularly collaborates with international organizations to bring to global attention issues that relate to a wide array of human institution. Some of such collaboration have been with the British Broadcasting Corporation, Al Jazeera, the Ghana Ports and Harbours Authority, the Government of Ghana. 

In June 2018, it premiered an investigative documentary on football corruption in Africa titled Number 12. It resulted in several high-profile football administrators, referees and FIFA committee members resigning from their positions.

References

External links
Official Website
Detective Agency

Investigative journalism
Private intelligence agencies

he has so many workers living abroad as a result of panic of been murdered one day.